Citizens a political party in Georgia, which was founded on August 4, 2020. The party ran for the first time in the 2020 parliamentary elections. The leader of the party is former Tbilisi mayoral candidate Aleko Elisashvili.

On December 7, 2018, Aleko Elisashvili founded the NGO "Georgian Civil Movement". The co-founders of the movement were: Levan Ioseliani and Vato Surguladze. At that time Elisashvili did not rule out that the movement could later be formed as a party. On August 4, 2020 Elisashil formed the Citizens party and ran for office.

In the 2020 parliamentary elections, the party won 25,508 (1.33%) votes and managed to enter parliament. Aleko Elisashvili and Levan Ioseliani were elected members of Parliament from party list.  the party's formal leader Elisashvili ran in the Saburtalo constituency, where he received 14,181 (19.38%) votes in the first round. In the second round, Elisashvili, along with the entire opposition, boycotted the election on the grounds of Election fraud.

Electoral Performance

Parliamentary

Local

References

Political parties in Georgia (country)
Pro-European political parties in Georgia (country)